Uncial 0296 (in the Gregory-Aland numbering), is a Greek uncial manuscript of the New Testament. Palaeographically it has been assigned to the 6th century.

Description 
The codex contains a parts of the text of the 1 John 5:3-13 and 2 Corinthians 7:3-4.9-10, on 2 parchment leaves. The text is written in two columns per page, 21 lines per page, in uncial letters.

Currently it is dated by the INTF to the 6th century.

Location 
It is one of the manuscripts discovered in Saint Catherine's Monastery at Sinai in May 1975, during the restoration work.

Currently the codex is housed at the St. Catherine's Monastery (N.E. ΜΓ 48, 53, 55) in Sinai.

See also 

 List of New Testament uncials
 Biblical manuscript
 Textual criticism

References

Further reading 

 

Greek New Testament uncials
6th-century biblical manuscripts